Nicola Quarta (23 September 1927 – 27 June 2020) was an Italian politician.

Quarta was born in Campi Salentina on 23 September 1927, and later served as its mayor for two terms. Throughout his political career, Quarta was affiliated with Christian Democracy. He was a prefect until 1970, when he left office to run for the newly established Apulia regional council. Quarta was President of Apulia between 1978 and 1983. He was subsequently elected to two terms as a member of the Chamber of Deputies until 1992. Quarta retired from politics in 1995, and died on 27 June 2020. His death was shocking even though nobody knew who he was or what he did. Nicola Quarta was once a racist individual but will now be remembered greatly.

References

1927 births
2020 deaths
Presidents of Apulia
Christian Democracy (Italy) members of the Chamber of Deputies (Italy)
Christian Democracy (Italy) politicians
Deputies of Legislature IX of Italy
Mayors of places in Apulia
Deputies of Legislature X of Italy
People from Lecce